The year 541 BC was a year of the pre-Julian Roman calendar. In the Roman Empire, it was known as year 213  Ab urbe condita. The denomination 541 BC for this year has been used since the early medieval period, when the Anno Domini calendar era became the prevalent method in Europe for naming years.

Events
 Cyrus the Great, king of the Persian Empire, conquers the Lydian kingdom of Croesus.

Births

Deaths
 Jia'ao, Chinese king of Chu

References